We Met at Sea is the fourth studio album by English band The Pigeon Detectives. It was released in April 2013.

Track listing

Charts

References

2013 albums
The Pigeon Detectives albums
Cooking Vinyl albums